Preljub (c. 1312–1356) was a Serbian magnate who served Emperor Stefan Dušan (r. 1331–55) as vojvoda (general). He participated in the southern conquests and held Thessaly with the rank of caesar (kesar) in 1348–56. His son Thomas Preljubović was Despot of Epirus in 1366–84.

Biography
Preljub appears in sources in 1344, taking part in the Serbian conquest of Macedonia during the Byzantine civil war of 1341–1347. According to contemporary chroniclers, Stefan Dušan considered him the best of all his magnates "in valor, courage and experience". In May 1344, he led a Serbian army in the Battle of Stephaniana against the Emirate of Aydin, allies of the Byzantine emperor John VI Kantakouzenos. The battle was a defeat, but it did not seriously affect the progress of the Serbian conquest. In 1348, reinforced with large numbers of Albanians, Preljub invaded Thessaly. Aided by the depopulation brought about by the Black Death, which, among others, had killed the local Byzantine governor, John Angelos, he wrested most of the region from the Byzantines and the Catalans of the Duchy of Neopatria by November of the same year. Dušan named him governor of Thessaly, with Trikala as his seat, and gave him the title of caesar as a reward. Several earlier scholars have stated that Preljub also controlled parts of Epirus, including the city of Ioannina, but recent research regards this as unlikely, and most likely the result of additions or mistakes in later sources.

In 1350, John VI Kantakouzenos took advantage of Dušan's absence in a campaign against Bosnia, and attempted to recover his lost provinces in Macedonia and Thessaly. He landed at Thessalonica and succeeded in regaining several key fortresses in Macedonia, but his advance towards Thessaly was stopped by Preljub, who, with 500 men, held the strategically important fortress of Servia against him. Kantakouzenos, whose army was rather small, withdrew, and Dušan was able to recover his lost fortresses with ease.

Preljub died in late 1355, or early 1356, shortly after Dušan himself, in a clash with local Albanian clans. His widow, Irene Asanina, a daughter of Dushan, and their son Thomas, soon faced an invasion by Nikephoros Orsini, the former Despot of Epirus. Orsini managed to rally the Greek inhabitants of the province to his side, forcing Irene to return to Serbia. In 1357, she married Radoslav Hlapen, the governor of much of western Macedonia, including Vodena and Berrhoea. In 1366/67, Thomas became ruler of the Despotate of Epirus at Ioannina.

Annotations

References

Sources

Further reading

1310s births
1350s deaths
Year of birth uncertain
Year of death uncertain
14th-century Serbian nobility
Generals of Stefan Dušan
People of the Serbian Empire
Medieval Serbian military leaders
Caesars (Byzantine nobles)
Medieval rulers of Thessaly
Medieval Serbian magnates
14th-century soldiers
Boyars of Stefan Dušan